James Bertrand Longley is an American filmmaker.

Career 
His work includes the documentary, Gaza Strip, released in 2002. His production, Iraq in Fragments, presents a view of Iraq and Iraqis during the first two years of Iraq War.  It was awarded three jury awards at the 2006 Sundance Film Festival and was nominated for an Academy Award for Best Documentary Feature, but lost to An Inconvenient Truth. His short film  Sari's Mother premiered at the 2006 Toronto International Film Festival and was nominated for an Academy Award for Documentary Short but lost to Freeheld.

In 2009, Longley was awarded a $500,000 MacArthur Fellowship "Genius Grant."

Between 2007 and 2009 Longley was working on a film in Iran. The film was cut short during the time of the elections and ensuing protests in June, 2009. On Sunday, June 14, The New York Times Lede blog reported he "was arrested with his translator while interviewing people on a street in Tehran, near the Interior Ministry," and later interviewed him about his and his translator's experiences. This film is currently on hold indefinitely.

Following up on IRAQ IN FRAGMENTS, Longley produced and filmed the feature documentary ANGELS ARE MADE OF LIGHT in Afghanistan. The film, following life in a school over three years, makes Afghan reality accessible by giving the audience a human-scale entry point - the world of a neighborhood school in Kabul - through which the larger context of Afghan society and history may be more clearly understood.

Reviewing ANGELS ARE MADE OF LIGHT in the Los Angeles Times in 2019, film critic Kenneth Turan wrote: “What is life like on the ground for ordinary people in another culture, another world? That’s been the bread and butter of observational documentaries for forever, but almost never is it done with the kind of beauty and grace filmmaker James Longley brings to his Afghanistan-set ANGELS ARE MADE OF LIGHT. As his 2006 Oscar-nominated IRAQ IN FRAGMENTS demonstrated, MacArthur Fellow Longley, who serves as his own cinematographer as well as directs, has an almost magical ability to envelope us in other realities. He does it via the poetry of his imagery as well as a gift for focused illumination that creates empathetic portraits of people who are both ordinary and intensely involving."

After a festival run starting at Telluride, TIFF and the New York Film Festival, ANGELS ARE MADE OF LIGHT opened theatrically at Film Forum and was the New York Times’ Critic’s Pick.

He is the founder of Daylight Factory, a production company committed to creating documentary films about international subjects with international appeal.

Personal life 

Longley's middle name is a tribute to philosopher Bertrand Russell. He studied "film and Russian at Wesleyan University and the All-Russian Institute of Cinematography (VGIK) at Moscow." Longley is fluent in Russian.

Filmography

Honors and awards 
 2011 United States Artists Ford Fellow
 2009 MacArthur Fellow
 2008 Academy Award nomination, Best Documentary Short
 Emmy Award nomination, Best Cinematography
 2007 Academy Award nomination, Best Documentary Feature
 2006 Award for Best Documentary Directing, Sundance Film Festival
 2006 Award for Best Documentary Editing, Sundance Film Festival
 2006 Award for Best Documentary Cinematography, Sundance Film Festival
 2006 Gotham Award, Best Documentary Film
 Best Documentary, Cleveland International Film Festival
 Gold Hugo, Chicago Film Festival, Best Documentary
 Grand Jury Award, Full Frame Festival
 International Documentary Association Award, Best Documentary Film
 International Federation of Film Critics Award, Thessaloniki
 Nestor Almendros Award, Human Rights Watch Film Festival
 1994 Student Academy Award

References

External links
Daylight Factory website
Iraq In Fragments website

An interview with James Longley, the director of Iraq in Fragments 29 June 2006 with Joanne Laurier on the World Socialist Web Site

Year of birth missing (living people)
Living people
American documentary filmmakers
Sundance Film Festival award winners
Wesleyan University alumni
MacArthur Fellows